Joseph Roger Rémi Bujold,  (born October 18, 1944) is a Canadian lawyer and former politician.

Bujold began his career in politics in the early 1970s as special assistant to the Minister of Financial Institutions in the Quebec cabinet during the Bourassa Liberal government. He then became chief of staff to Quebec's Minister of State for Social Affairs. In 1975, he became special assistant to the Prime Minister of Canada, Pierre Trudeau.

Bujold was first elected to the House of Commons of Canada in the 1979 federal election as the Liberal Member of Parliament for Bonaventure—Îles-de-la-Madeleine. The Liberal party was defeated in the election, and Bujold joined the Liberals on the opposition benches. He was re-elected in the 1980 election that defeated the Progressive Conservative government and returned the Liberals to power.

In 1981, he became Parliamentary Secretary to the Minister of Employment and Immigration. He became Chairman of the federal Liberal caucus in 1983. In June 1984, Trudeau's successor, John Turner brought Bujold into the Cabinet as Minister of State for regional development. Both the Turner government and Bujold were defeated in the 1984 federal election.

He returned to Quebec City to become chief of staff to Robert Bourassa while he was the provincial Leader of the Opposition.

Bujold attempted to regain his seat in the 1988 federal election but was unsuccessful.

Bujold founded Consilium, a public affairs consultancy in Quebec that merged with GPC Public Affairs in 1994, at which point he became senior counsel with GPC.
   
Bujold is Chair of the Canadian Landmine Foundation, and Past-Chairman of the Board of the Council for Canadian Unity, an organization that he joined in 1990.

In 1996, he was made a Member of the Order of Canada.

External links
Order of Canada Citation

1944 births
Living people
Liberal Party of Canada MPs
Members of the House of Commons of Canada from Quebec
Members of the Order of Canada
Members of the King's Privy Council for Canada
Members of the 23rd Canadian Ministry